Wahoo Studios is a computer and video game development company based in Orem, Utah.  Founded in 2001, the company largely serves as consultants or on a contract basis working with larger gaming companies such as Electronic Arts and Microsoft. Historically, the development house has mostly been responsible for console games. Self-funded original games use the NinjaBee brand. Since the release of the Xbox 360, the developer has supported Xbox Live Arcade with multiple releases, including A Kingdom for Keflings and A World of Keflings.

Events / History
Wahoo Studios owes its roots to another Utah-based video game developer, Saffire. As Saffire encountered difficulties in 2001, Steve Taylor, the founder and president of Wahoo Studios, as well as a number of other employees, left to find more stable employment elsewhere.

In 2004, Wahoo Studios introduced the brand name NinjaBee for use in developing self-funded games, reserving the title of Wahoo Studios for projects done on a contractual basis.

In January 2007, Wahoo Studios announced that they were joining the Massively multiplayer online game genre with Saga, an MMORTS, based in a persistent world for the PC. However, in August 2007, they split - Saga Games and Silverlode Interactive finished the development of the game.

Titles

Unreleased
Wahoo Studios had been working on Space Station Tycoon.

References

Software companies based in Utah
Video game companies established in 2001
Video game companies of the United States
Video game development companies
2001 establishments in Utah
Companies based in Orem, Utah